This is a list of Hindu temples in England, sorted by region.

London

Others

See also
 Hinduism in England
 List of Hindu temples in the United Kingdom
 Lists of Hindu temples by country

References

External links 
 Hindu Temples in UK
 List of Major Hindu Temples in Britain
 ISKCON temples worldwide
 Hindu Temple and Communities in United Kingdom 
 Live broadcast from many Hindu temples from India

 01
England
Hindu temples
Indian diaspora in the United Kingdom
E